Zubaida or variants may refer to:

 Zubaida (name), or variant spellings, including a list of people with the given name or surname
 865 Zubaida, an asteroid
 Zubeidaa, a 2001 Indian film
 Zoebaida (also spelled Zubaida), a 1940 film from the Dutch East Indies

See also

 Syair Siti Zubaidah Perang Cina, a 19th-century Malayan poem